Paris Concert is a live solo piano album by American pianist Keith Jarrett, recorded on October 17, 1988 at the Salle Pleyel in Paris and released by ECM Records in April 1990.

1988 solo piano concerts
According to www.keithjarrett.org, in 1988 Jarrett toured Europe two times (June, October) offering 6 solo concerts:. Paris concert was recorded during the second 1988 European mini-tour.

 June 16 - Istanbul (Turkey) during Istanbul International Jazz Festival
 June 20 - Patras (Greece) during Patras International Festival.
 June 23 - Palermo (Italy)
 October 17 - Paris (France)
 October 22 - Brussels (Belgium) during the Belga Jazz Festival
 October 24 - Madrid (Spain) during Festival de Jazz de Madrid

Reception
A usually enthusiastic reviewer, Richard Lehnert at Stereophile states that "this is Jarrett's most satisfying solo outing since 1982's Concerts" and gave the album the "Recording of November 1990" award. As for the recording technique and results he states that:

Despite a 4 out of 5 stars rating, a less enthusiastic Allmusic review by Richard S. Ginell states that "Jarrett pulls further away from the old rousing (and thoroughly American) gospel, blues and folk roots of earlier concerts toward a more abstract concept" and that "[his] virtuosic abilities are never in doubt, and he rarely flaunts his technique for its own sake, but one senses that the inspiration level is down; one doesn't come out of the CD all charged up as with many earlier solo concerts."

Track listing 
The first track on the album is a characteristic lengthy 38-minutes solo improvisation entitled "October 17, 1988". 
The second track is a performance of "The Wind", a ballad by American jazz composers Russ Freeman and Jerry Gladstone, the first time that Jarrett included composed works by anyone else in any of his solo piano live albums. 
Finally, the third track is an improvised C Major blues which would become a trademark in future solo concerts.

"October 17, 1988" – 38:23
"The Wind" (Freeman, Gladstone) - 6:32
"Blues" - 5:22
All music by Keith Jarrett except as indicated.
Total effective playing time: 48:33 (the album contains 1:44 applause approximately)

Personnel 
 Keith Jarrett – piano

Production
 Manfred Eicher – producer
 Peter Laenger – engineer (recording)
 Andreas Neubronner – engineer (recording)
 Jean-Pierre Larcher - photography
 Barbara Wojirsch - cover design and layout

References 

Paris Concert
Paris Concert
ECM Records live albums
Albums produced by Manfred Eicher
Instrumental albums
Solo piano jazz albums